Patrick Joseph O'Brien (16 April 1893 – 25 March 1964) was an Australian rules footballer who played with Carlton in the Victorian Football League (VFL).

Football
O'Brien was a physically tough defender who usually played at centre half back. He was Carlton's captain in 1924, and was a member of Carlton's back-to-back premierships in 1914 and 1915.

In 1925, he commenced the season as Carlton's playing coach but lasted only two games due to disagreements within the team. He left to join Footscray during their inaugural VFL season but played just 15 games for the club.

Notes

References
Holmesby, Russell and Main, Jim (2007). The Encyclopedia of AFL Footballers. 7th ed. Melbourne: Bas Publishing.

External links

Blueseum profile

1893 births
1964 deaths
Australian rules footballers from Melbourne
Players of Australian handball
Carlton Football Club players
Carlton Football Club Premiership players
Carlton Football Club coaches
Western Bulldogs players
Yarraville Football Club players
Two-time VFL/AFL Premiership players
People from Footscray, Victoria